The South African Soccer League (SASL) was an association football league based in South Africa. It was formed in 1961 and folded in 1967. It was established by the South African Soccer Federation which represented the black African, Coloured and Indian population. In South Africa under apartheid, integrated sport was banned, so white South Africans played in the National Football League. The SASL folded due to a lack of playing grounds but in 1969, the SASF launched a new league, the Federation Professional League.

Champions 

Source:

References 

Defunct soccer leagues in South Africa
Soccer and apartheid